Young Sinners is an American Pre-Code drama film released on May 17, 1931, directed by John G. Blystone. The screenplay was initially written by Maurine Watkins though the script filmed was William Conselman's, not Watkins'. (Watkin's script is in the archives of 20th Century Fox's produced scripts). Conselman scrapped her screenplay in favor of his own (adaptation, continuity and dialog, according to American Film Institute) based on the play Young Sinners by Elmer Harris (New York, November 28, 1929).

Cast
Thomas Meighan - Tom McGuire
Hardie Albright - Gene Gibson
Dorothy Jordan - Constance Sinclair
Cecilia Loftus - Mrs. Sinclair
James Kirkwood - John Gibson
Edmund Breese - Trent
Lucien Prival - Baron von Konitz
Arnold Lucy - Butler
Nora Lane - Maggie McGuire
Joan Castle - Sue
John Arledge - Jimmy
Edward Nugent - Bud
Yvonne Pelletier - Madge
Steve Pendleton - Reggie
Billy Butts - Tim

References

External links
 
 
 lobby poster

1931 films
Fox Film films
1931 drama films
American drama films
American black-and-white films
Films directed by John G. Blystone
1930s American films